Vakhtang "Vaho" Iagorashvili (born April 5, 1964 in Tbilisi, Georgia) is a Soviet modern pentathlete, who has been a member of three different Olympic teams during his sporting career.

Iagorashvili emerged as the top favorite to win the men's individual and team modern pentathlon in the late 1980s. As a competitor for the Soviet Union, he had won the bronze medal at the 1988 Summer Olympics in Seoul, and gold at the 1990 Goodwill Games in Seattle, became a three-time national champion for the team, and claimed multiple titles at the world championships. He also won three European titles (two golds and one bronze for the individual and team events). After the fall of the Soviet Union in 1991, Iagorashvili retired from his sport, and emigrated to the United States to work as a physical education instructor at the Austin Community College in Austin, Texas.

Iagorashvili eventually came out of retirement in 1995, and qualify for the men's modern pentathlon at the 1996 Summer Olympics in Atlanta, representing his birth nation Georgia. Vaho  gained his U.S. citizenship in 2002 making him eligible to compete at the 2004 Summer Olympics in Athens. Between 1999 and 2004, Iagorashvili was appointed to be the coach of the U.S. Olympic Pentathlon Team.

Iagorashvili finally represented the United States at the 2004 Summer Olympics in Athens, after receiving an automatic qualifying place from the 2003 Pan American Games in Santo Domingo, where he won the gold medal. At the Olympics, he bettered his performance in the men's modern pentathlon event, finishing only in ninth place with a score of 5,276 points.

Iagorashvili received a master's degree in physical education from Georgia Institute of Physical Cultures and Sport in Tbilisi, in 1985.

Iagorashvili is currently coaching both men's and women's fencing teams at Penn State University in University Park, Pennsylvania. He is married to American modern pentathlete, Mary Beth Iagorashvili.

References

External links
Profile – Penn State Athletic Site

1964 births
Living people
Soviet male modern pentathletes
Male modern pentathletes from Georgia (country)
American male modern pentathletes
Olympic modern pentathletes of the Soviet Union
Olympic modern pentathletes of Georgia (country)
Olympic modern pentathletes of the United States
Olympic bronze medalists for the Soviet Union
Olympic medalists in modern pentathlon
Modern pentathletes at the 1988 Summer Olympics
Modern pentathletes at the 1996 Summer Olympics
Modern pentathletes at the 2004 Summer Olympics
Sportspeople from Tbilisi
Medalists at the 1988 Summer Olympics
Pan American Games gold medalists for the United States
Pan American Games medalists in modern pentathlon
Modern pentathletes at the 2003 Pan American Games
Competitors at the 1990 Goodwill Games
Medalists at the 2003 Pan American Games